The men's marathon event was a special race invented as part of the Athletics at the 1896 Summer Olympics programme. Seventeen athletes from 5 nations competed. It was the capstone of the athletics programme. The event was won by Spyridon Louis and was the only Greek victory in athletics.

Background

Michel Bréal originated the idea of a race from the city of Marathon to Athens, taking inspiration from the legend of Pheidippides. The first such marathon race was a Greek national competition that served as a qualifier for the Olympic marathon, won by Charilaos Vasilakos. The length of the marathon in 1896 was approximately 40 km (25 mi).

While twenty-five athletes traveled to Marathon for the race, only seventeen actually began the race.

At least one woman, Stamata Revithi, attempted to enter the race, but this was rejected. Officially, the reason given was that her entry came after the deadline; unofficially, the reason was her gender. She ran the course on her own the next day, covering the distance in 5½ hours. 

There are also references to a woman named Melpomene attempting to run; there is dispute whether this was a second woman, or instead it was Revithi.

Summary

Just as in the 1500 metre race, Albin Lermusiaux took the lead early. Edwin Flack and Arthur Blake maintained second and third place, until Blake dropped out at 23 kilometres. At 32 kilometres, Lermusiaux dropped out as well, leaving Flack in the lead as Spyridon Louis was making full use of his endurance to reach the front. 
 
Exhausted from trying to maintain his pace, Flack dropped out of the race with three kilometres left, leaving Louis alone at the front; he stormed home to finish the 40 kilometre race in one minutes and ten seconds under three hours. 

Vasilakos finished second, followed by Spyridon Belokas, who held off a fast-finishing Gyula Kellner to seemingly complete a Greek top-three sweep. 

However, Kellner subsequently lodged a protest, claiming Belokas had covered part of the course by carriage after having supposedly dropped out of the race: the protest was upheld, and Belokas was disqualified.

Records

Marathon distances at the time were not standardized and records were not officially recognized. The best time in a qualifying race was by Lavrentis.

Spyridon Louis ran the Olympic marathon in 2:58:50, an Olympic record and unofficial world best.

Schedule

The runners traveled to the town of Marathon on Thursday night. They assembled on the starting bridge at 2 p.m. on Friday.

Results

References
  (Digitally available at la84foundation.org)
  (Excerpt available at la84foundation.org)
 

Specific

Men's marathon
Marathons at the Olympics
Men's marathons